A pedestrian village is a compact, pedestrian-oriented neighborhood or town with a mixed-use village center. Shared-use lanes for pedestrians and those using bicycles, Segways, wheelchairs, and other small rolling conveyances that do not use internal combustion engines. Generally, these lanes are in front of the houses and businesses, and streets for motor vehicles are always at the rear. Some pedestrian villages might be nearly car-free with cars either hidden below the buildings, or on the boundary  of the village. Venice, Italy is essentially a pedestrian village with canals. Other examples of a pedestrian village include Giethoorn village located in the Dutch province of Overijssel, Netherlands, Mont-Tremblant Pedestrian Village located beside Mont-Tremblant, Quebec, Canada, and Culdesac Tempe in Tempe, Arizona.

The canal district in Venice, California, on the other hand, combines the front lane/rear street approach with canals and walkways, or just walkways.

See also

 List of car-free places
 New Urbanism

Principles of intelligent urbanism

Urban vitality
Walkability
Walking audit

Infrastructure:

References
[2016] absolutetremblantlocations

External links
 Pedestrian Villages website
 World Carfree Network
 Village Homes, Davis, California

Urban planning
Transportation planning
Neighbourhoods by type